"Smooth Sailing" is a song by American rock band Queens of the Stone Age from their sixth studio album ...Like Clockwork. It was released as a promotional single on February 27, 2014. Dave Grohl (Foo Fighters, Nirvana) recorded drums on this track for the album.

Music video
The music video, directed by Hiro Murai, was released on April 4, 2014. It shows frontman Josh Homme as a businessman who joins a group of Japanese businessmen on a night in the city filled with alcohol, drugs, strippers, and karaoke. At one point, they beat up a man and steal his sports car for a joyride. One of the businessmen separates from the group and hallucinates that people around him are demonic creatures with light coming from their eyes and mouths, and he kills them before the other businessmen find him. The video ends in the desert, with Homme and the other businessmen watching their associate bury the bodies of the people he killed as the sun rises.

Chart positions

References

2013 songs
Songs written by Josh Homme
Queens of the Stone Age songs